"Crystallized" is a song by American alternative rock band Young the Giant. On December 10, 2013, it was released as the second single from the band's second studio album, Mind over Matter. The song debuted at number 27 on the Billboard Hot Rock Songs chart.

A music video for the song, directed by Elliott Sellers, was released onto YouTube on December 8, 2013.

Charts

References

2013 songs
2013 singles
Young the Giant songs
Fueled by Ramen singles